Anita Gradin (12 August 1933 – 23 May 2022) was a Swedish politician and ambassador. She was the Minister with responsibility for immigrant and equality affairs at the Ministry of Labour in Sweden from 1982 to 1986. She was Minister of Foreign Trade at the Ministry of Foreign Affairs from 1986 to 1991. From 1995 to 1999 she was a member of the European Commission responsible for Immigration, home affairs and justice; relations with the Ombudsman; and Financial Control and Fraud prevention.

Gradin was president of Socialist International Women and worked against the trafficking of women.

Biography 
Gradin was the daughter of the paper worker Ossian Gradin (1910–1986) and Alfhild Gradin (1913–1984), born Englund. She was married to Lieutenant Colonel Bertil Kersfelt. Gradin graduated in 1950, studied at the Swedish School of 1953, at the 1954 British School of Economics, at the Nordic Folk High School in Geneva in 1958, and became a socialist in Stockholm in 1960. She was a journalist at the Västerbotten Folkblad from 1950–52, employed by the Swedish Forestry and Floating Workers' Union 1952–55, journalist at Arbetarbladet in Gävle 1955–58 and at the TCO magazine 1960–63. Gradin was employed by the Social Affairs Planning Committee in Stockholm as secretary of the City College's Women's Affairs Committee, 1963–67, Secretary of State at the 1963 Council of Ministers, Member of the School Board's Educational Board 1971–81, by the International Health and Social Affairs Committee 1972–78, chairman of the Board of International Adoption Issues 1973–79 and Member of the 1982 Experts Group on Immigration Research. Gradin was a member of the 1974 Semester Committee 1974–1975, of the 1974–1977 Research Education Survey, by the Delegation for Gender Equality 1975–1976, by the 1978–81 Research Co-operation Committee and by the 1980–80 Abortion Committee. She was a specialist in the hotel and restaurant survey 1974–78, a member of the 1975 business committee 1975–77, chairman of Sweden's social association 1976–81, and board member of Stockholm's workers' municipality 1968–82. She was chairman of the Stockholm City Social Democratic Women's District 1968–82 and Vice Chairman of the Women's Association from 1975. Gradin was a member of the City Council in Stockholm in 1966–68 as well as a member of the Danish People's Welfare Board / Dental Committee 1966–76. In 1997, Gradin was appointed as an honorary citizen in her hometown, Umeå.

Positions 
Member of the Riksdag (in the second chamber of Stockholm city 1969–70) 1969–1992
Deputy member of the 1969–70 Committees
Deputy member of the Justice Committee 1971–82
Member of the Education Committee 1971–76
Member of the Finance Committee 1976–82
Alternate member of the Council of Europe's Swedish delegation 1973–80 and member 1981–82
State Council 8 October 1982 – 1991
Ministry of Labor (Minister for Immigration and Equal Opportunities) 1982–1986
Minister of Foreign Trade 1986–1991
Member of the Riksdag, Vice Chairman of the Committee on Nutrition 1991–1992
Ambassador to Vienna 1992–1994
Member of the European Commission 1995–1999
Chairman of the Chamber of Commerce Sweden-Israel

EU Commissioner 
When Sweden joined the European Union in 1995, Gradin was appointed Sweden's first member of the European Commission, under its chairman, Jacques Santer. She was responsible for immigration, justice and home affairs, relations with the European Ombudsman, economic governance and control and anti-fraud. She ended up in focus since the anti-fraud campaign was found to be neglected and several Commissioners, in particular, Édith Cresson, were accused of corruption. In March 1999, the entire Santer Commission was forced to resign and be replaced by an interim commission led by Manuel Marín. Gradin was also included in the Marín Commission and finally resigned in November 1999 when the Prodi Commission took office. During her time in the EU Commission, Gradin contributed, among other things, to legislation on gender equality, increased transparency and criminalization of trafficking.

Death 
Gradin died in May 2022, aged 88.

Awards 
Gradin was nominated on 9 May 2007 by the European Movement in Sweden to the 2007 European of the Year in Sweden.

Works 
 Lagstadgad lycka? En bok om lag, samhälle och äktenskap (1971)
 Vårdkunskap: Socialmedicin (1972)
 Från bruket till Bryssel: minnen från ett politiskt liv (2009)
 Klingvall och Ström (red): Från Myrdal till Lindh. Svenska diplomatprofiler. (2010)

Biographies (selection) 
Statutory happiness? A book about society, marriage and marriage (1971) 
Health Care: Social Medicine (1972) 
From the mill to Brussels: memories of a political life (2009) 
Klingvall and Strøm (red): From Myrdal to Lindh. Swedish diplomat profiles. (2010)

References

Notes
 ^ Vem är det : Svensk biografisk handbok 1999, red. Elisabeth Gafvelin, Kunskapsförlaget P. A. Norstedt & Söners Förlag, Stockholm 1998  ISSN 0347-3341 s. 376

Printed sources 
 Fakta om folkvalda: Riksdagen 1985–1988, utgiven av Riksdagens förvaltningskontor, Stockholm 1986 ISSN 0283-4251 s. 105

Webb sources 
 Anita Gradin (s) – Riksdagen
 Arkiv: Anita Gradins meritförteckning Europeiska kommissionens webbplats

External links

1933 births
2022 deaths
Swedish Social Democratic Party politicians
Swedish Ministers for Gender Equality
Swedish European Commissioners
Women government ministers of Sweden
Women European Commissioners
Ambassadors of Sweden to Austria
Women members of the Riksdag
20th-century Swedish women politicians
20th-century Swedish politicians
People from Umeå Municipality